Jane Sheldon is a Sydney-born Australian soprano, largely based in New York City. She was nominated for the 2013 ARIA Award for Best Classical Album for the album North + South which was recorded with Genevieve Lang (harp) and the Acacia Quartet.

Eliza Aria from Elena Kats-Chernin's ballet Wild Swans was first recorded by Sheldon. This recording was used in a series of television and cinema advertisements for British bank Lloyds TSB, and then as the theme music for Phillip Adams' ABC Radio National programme Late Night Live. In 2018, Sheldon performed in the premiere of Damien Ricketson's wordless opera The Howling Girls, directed by Adena Jacobs at Carriageworks.

Personal life
Sheldon is married to philosopher Peter Godfrey-Smith.

Discography

ARIA Music Awards
The ARIA Music Awards is an annual awards ceremony that recognises excellence, innovation, and achievement across all genres of Australian music. They commenced in 1987. 

! 
|-
| 2013
| North + South
| Best Classical Album
| 
| 
|-

References

External links

Articles by and about Jane Sheldon, Australian Music Centre

Living people
Year of birth missing (living people)
Singers from Sydney
Australian operatic sopranos